"Big Bank" is a song recorded by American rapper YG featuring 2 Chainz, Big Sean and Nicki Minaj. Produced by DJ Mustard, it was released on May 25, 2018, as the second single from YG's third studio album, Stay Dangerous (2018).

Chart performance
Big Bank debuted at number 66 on the US Billboard Hot 100 on the chart dated June 9, 2018. After climbing the charts for weeks, the song eventually reached its peak position at number 16 on the chart dated August 18, 2018, becoming YG's highest-charting song as a lead artist. On September 10, 2020, the single was certified quadruple platinum by the Recording Industry Association of America (RIAA) for combined sales and streaming equivalent units of over four million units in the United States.

Madden NFL 19 controversy
The song is featured on the soundtrack of the 2018 video game Madden NFL 19. Prior to its release, it was revealed Electronic Arts had removed quarterback Colin Kaepernick's name from the song, which led to outcry on social media. Big Sean, who raps the verse, called the action "disappointing and appalling". EA responded to the criticism by saying:

Music video
The music video for "Big Bank" premiered via YG's Vevo channel on June 23, 2018.

Live performances
YG performed the song at the BET Awards alongside 2 Chainz, Big Sean and Nicki Minaj on June 24, 2018.

Charts

Weekly charts

Year-end charts

Certifications

Release history

References

2018 singles
2018 songs
2 Chainz songs
Big Sean songs
Nicki Minaj songs
YG (rapper) songs
Song recordings produced by Mustard (record producer)
Songs written by 2 Chainz
Songs written by Big Sean
Songs written by Mustard (record producer)
Songs written by Nicki Minaj
Songs written by YG (rapper)